Lee Han-dong (5 December 1934 – 8 May 2021) was a South Korean politician. He served from May 2000 to July 2002 as the 33rd prime minister of South Korea.

References

1934 births
2021 deaths
People from Pocheon
Prime Ministers of South Korea
Kyungbock High School alumni
Seoul National University School of Law alumni
20th-century South Korean people
21st-century South Korean people
Goseong Lee clan